Breckland District Council is elected every four years.

Political control
Since the first elections to the council in 1973 political control of the council has been held by the following parties:

Leadership
The leaders of the council since 1998 have been:

Council elections
1973 Breckland District Council election
1976 Breckland District Council election
1979 Breckland District Council election (New ward boundaries)
1983 Breckland District Council election
1987 Breckland District Council election
1991 Breckland District Council election (District boundary changes took place but the number of seats remained the same)
1995 Breckland District Council election
1999 Breckland District Council election
2003 Breckland District Council election (New ward boundaries)
2007 Breckland District Council election
2011 Breckland District Council election
2015 Breckland District Council election (New ward boundaries)
2019 Breckland District Council election

For by-election results, please see the page on Breckland District Council By-elections.

District result maps

By-election results

Note: swings cannot be given: Harling and Heathlands was previously uncontested.

References

External links
Breckland Council

 
Council elections in Norfolk
Breckland District
District council elections in England